Counties 3 Cornwall  (formerly known as Tribute Cornwall League 2) is an English level nine rugby union league for clubs based in Cornwall. The champions and runner-up are promoted to Counties 2 Cornwall (formerly Cornwall League 1); there is no relegation. The league ran continuously since 1987–88, except for a two-season break, when Cornwall 2 combined with Cornwall League 1 for seasons 2009–10 and 2010–11. The competition recommenced in 2011–12 when it was decided to form two leagues of seven teams each. 

For the 2016–17 season Cornwall 1 and Cornwall 2 were amalgamated to create the Cornwall League with fifteen teams playing each other once in the first phase. After Christmas the teams split into two leagues with the top eight playing in Cornwall One and the remainder playing in Cornwall Two. For the 2018–19 season Cornwall League 1 and Cornwall League 2 reverted to separate divisions. 

St Ives are the current champions and promoted to [Counties 2 Cornwall and St Agnes are the most successful team having won the league on six occasions.

Format
The season runs from September to April and comprises twenty rounds of matches, with each club playing each of its rivals, home and away. The results of the matches contribute points to the league as follows:
 4 points are awarded for a win
 2 points are awarded for a draw
 0 points are awarded for a loss, however
 1 losing (bonus) point is awarded to a team that loses a match by 7 points or fewer
 1 additional (bonus) point is awarded to a team scoring 4 tries or more in a match.

2022–23
Ten teams are competing in the current season. Perranporth, Redruth Albany and St Just returned from the 2021–22 competition. Lankelly-Fowey, Roseland and St Agnes were relegated from Cornwall 1, while four club 2nd teams joined the league; Bude II, Camborne II, Launceston II and Wadebridge Camels II.

2021–22

Participating teams and locations
Stithians, who finished 4th in 2019–20, returned for 2021–22 but withdrew from the league in September 2021, consequently it ran with five teams instead.

League table

2020–21
Due to the  COVID-19 pandemic, the 2020–21 season was cancelled.

2019–20

Participating teams and locations

League table

2018–19

Participating teams and locations

League table

2017–18

League table (phase 2)

2016–17
For the current season Cornwall 1 and Cornwall 2 have been amalgamated to create the Cornwall League with fifteen teams playing each other once in the first phase. After Christmas the teams split into two leagues with the top eight playing in Cornwall One and the remainder playing in Cornwall Two.

Participating clubs (phase 2)

League table (phase 2)

2015–16
The first matches of the 2015–16 Cornwall League 2 were played on 10 October 2015 and the final matches on 2 April 2016 with the six teams playing each of the other teams twice to make ten matches each.

Participating clubs and locations

League table

2014–15
The 2014–15 Cornwall League 2 originally consisted of seven teams; each team playing the others twice, home and away. St Day withdrew before the season started reducing the league to six teams. The season started on 4 October 2014 and finished on 24 January 2015 with the champions, St Agnes promoted to Cornwall 1. Lanner, in their first season in league rugby was also promoted after finishing the league season in second place. Both promoted teams finished the league season unbeaten winning eight of their ten matches.

Participating clubs and locations

League table

2013–14
The 2013–14 Cornwall League 2 kicked off on 28 September 2013 and was due to finish on 18 January 2014 with each team playing each of the other teams three times. Owing to fixture cancellations the competition finished on 8 February 2014. The champions, Illogan Park are promoted to Cornwall 1, there is no relegation.

Participating clubs and locations

League table

2012–13

Participating clubs and locations

2011–12

Original teams
When league rugby began in 1987 this division contained the following teams:

Lankelly-Fowey
RAF St Mawgan
Redruth CGSOB
Roseland
Veor

Cornwall League 2 honours

Cornwall League 2 (1987–1993)
The original Cornwall 2 (sponsored by Courage) was a tier 10 league with promotion to Cornwall 1; there was no relegation.

Cornwall League 2 (1993–1996)
The creation of National 5 South for the 1993–94 season meant that the Cornwall League 2 dropped one tier to tier 11. Promotion was to Cornwall 1 and there was no relegation.

Cornwall League 2 (1996–2009)
The cancellation of National 5 South at the end of the 1995–96 season saw Cornwall League 2 return to being a tier 10 division. Promotion continued to Cornwall 1 and there was no relegation. From the 2008–09 season onwards the league sponsor is Tribute. Restructuring at the end of the 2008–09 season saw Cornwall 1 and Cornwall 2 clubs merged into a single Cornwall League.

Cornwall League 2 (2011–2016)
After an absence of several seasons, Cornwall 2 returned due to the splitting of the Cornwall League back into two separate divisions. Remaining at tier 10 of the league system, promotion was once again to Cornwall 1 and there was no relegation

Cornwall League 2 (2016–2017)
The 2016–17 season saw a restructuring of the Cornwall leagues. For the first half of the season, all clubs from Cornwall 1 and Cornwall 2 played in a single tier 9 division. In the second half of the season the league divided into Cornwall 1 and Cornwall 2 leagues based on the league position of the clubs. During this season there was no promotion or relegation to or from Cornwall 2.

Cornwall League 2 (2017–2022)
The 2017–18 season saw Cornwall 2 revert to being a tier 10 league. Promotion was to Cornwall 1 and there was no relegation.

Number of league titles

St Agnes (6)
Helston (5)
Illogan Park (3)
Redruth Albany (3)
Roseland (3)
Bodmin (2)
Veor (2)
Lankelly-Fowey (1)
Liskeard-Looe (1)
Mounts Bay (1)
St Day (1)
St Ives (1)
St Just (1)
Stithians (1)

Notes

Geography
The following clubs have participated in the Cornwall League 2.

Sponsorship
The competition is known as Cornwall League 2 and has been sponsored by St Austell Brewery from season 2011–12 through to the current season; Tribute is the name of a beer. For the first ten seasons (1987–88 to 1996–97) the league was sponsored by the Courage Brewery.

See also

 South West Division RFU
 Cornwall RFU
 English rugby union system
 Rugby union in Cornwall

References

External links
 Trelawny's Army (league tables and results)

 
20th century in Cornwall
21st century in Cornwall
4
Rugby union leagues in England
Sports leagues established in 1987